Gerhard T. Buchholz (1 January 1898 – 30 November 1970) was a German screenwriter, film producer and director. He wrote for more than 20 films between 1937 and 1963. He was a member of the jury at the 8th Berlin International Film Festival.

Selected filmography
 The Voice of the Heart (dir. Karlheinz Martin, 1937)
 The Rothschilds (dir. Erich Waschneck, 1940)
 Wild Bird (dir. Johannes Meyer, 1943)
 Why Are You Lying, Elisabeth? (1944)
 Thank You, I'm Fine (dir. Erich Waschneck, 1948)
 Amico (dir. Gerhard T. Buchholz, 1949)
 Turtledove General Delivery (dir. Gerhard T. Buchholz, 1952)
 No Way Back (dir. Victor Vicas, 1953)
 The Golden Plague (dir. John Brahm, 1954)

References

External links

1898 births
1970 deaths
German film producers
20th-century German screenwriters
German male screenwriters
German film directors